Dennis Leonard Lundy (born July 6, 1972) is a former American football running back who played one season in the National Football League with the Houston Oilers and Chicago Bears. He played college football at Northwestern University and attended George D. Chamberlain High School in Tampa, Florida. He was sentenced to one month in prison and two years probation on May 5, 1999 for lying to a federal grand jury investigating gambling by Northwestern athletes. Lundy admitted that he gambled on five games, while also deliberately fumbling the ball on the 1-yard line in a 1994 game against Iowa. He testified that the fumble was designed to win a $400 bet that the Wildcats wouldn't cover the point spread.

References

External links
Just Sports Stats
College stats

Living people
1972 births
Players of American football from Tampa, Florida
American football running backs
African-American players of American football
Northwestern Wildcats football players
Houston Oilers players
Chicago Bears players
21st-century African-American sportspeople
20th-century African-American sportspeople